"Breed" is a song by the American rock band Nirvana, written by vocalist and guitarist Kurt Cobain. It is the fourth song on their second studio album, Nevermind, released in September 1991.

Background and recording

Early history

Written by Cobain in 1989, "Breed" was originally titled "Imodium," after the anti-diarrhea medicine used by Tad Doyle, lead singer of Seattle rock band TAD, during Nirvana's and TAD's shared European tour. It was first performed live on October 8, 1989, at the Lif Ticket Lounge in Omaha, Nebraska.

"Breed" was first recorded in the studio in April 1990 by Butch Vig  at Smart Studios in Madison, Wisconsin, during the recording sessions for what was intended to be the band's second album on Sub Pop, their original label. However, this planned album was cancelled after the departure of drummer Chad Channing, and the session was instead used as a demo tape, which led to the band signing with DGC Records in 1991.

Nevermind
Vig re-recorded the song during the sessions for what became the band's second album and major label debut, Nevermind, in May 1991 at Sound City Studios in Van Nuys, California. Cobain recorded four vocal takes for the song, with each successive take "getting worse because he blew his voice out," as Vig recalls. The first take was chosen as the master. Both recordings of the song also feature the guitar being panned from one channel to the next during the guitar solo to create what Cobain biographer Charles R. Cross called "a dizzying" effect.

Post-Nevermind
"Breed" was performed for the last time live at Nirvana's final concert, at Terminal Einz in Munich, Germany on March 1, 1994.

Composition

Music

"Breed" is an punk rock song that runs for a duration of three minutes and three seconds. According to the sheet music published at Musicnotes.com by BMG Rights Management, it is written in the time signature of common time, with a moderately fast rock tempo of 160 beats per minute. "Breed" is composed in the key of F minor, while Kurt Cobain's vocal range spans one octave and three notes, from the low-note of C5 to the high-note of F5. The song follows a basic sequence of F5–E5–F5–A5–E5 in the verses and bridge and D5–A5–C5–B5 during the refrain  as its chord progression.

Lyrics
Lyrically, the song addresses themes of teenage apathy and fear within the American middle-class. Stevie Chick of Kerrang wrote that lyrics such as "We can plant a house, we can build a tree" displayed Cobain's "gift for crafting witty, purposeful nonsense."

Reception
In 2015, Rolling Stone ranked "Breed" at number four on their ranking of 102 Nirvana songs, with Julianne Escobedo Shepherd calling it "one of the most alive songs on Nevermind." In 2020, it was ranked 13th on Kerrang!'s The 20 Greatest Nirvana Songs - Ranked list, with Sam Law writing that it was "probably Nirvana’s greatest heads-down banger," and that "its 184 seconds feel guaranteed to light the fuse on every mosh within a 100-mile radius."

In 2017, to mark what would have been Cobain's 50th birthday, the Phonographic Performance Limited released a list of the top 20 most played Nirvana songs on television and the radio in the United Kingdom, in which "Breed" was ranked at number 13.

On April 24, 2020, the song was performed by American musicians Post Malone and Travis Barker during their 15-song Nirvana tribute concert, which was livestreamed on YouTube and raised more than $4 million for the COVID-19 Solidarity Response Fund.

In popular culture

The Nevermind version of "Breed" appears in the 2007 American action film Shoot 'Em Up, directed by Michael Davis. It also appears in the video game Tony Hawk's Proving Ground, also from 2007, and MotorStorm (video game).

Accolades

Other releases

A live version, recorded on December 3, 1989, at the London Astoria in London, England, appeared on the live compilation, From the Muddy Banks of the Wishkah, in November 1996. It features Channing on drums.
The studio version recorded at Smart Studios in April 1990 was released on the 20th anniversary "Deluxe" and "Super Deluxe" versions of Nevermind in September 2011.
A live version, recorded at the Commodore Ballroom in Vancouver, Canada, appeared as an Easter egg on the live video Live at the Paramount, released on DVD and Blu-Ray in September 2011.
An early "Rough mix" of the Nevermind version appeared on the band's posthumous box set, With the Lights Out, in November 2004. In September 2011, a second mix appeared on the 20th anniversary "Super Deluxe" version of Nevermind, which contained the early "Devonshire mixes" for the album.
A live version, recorded during the band's October 31, 1991 show at the Paramount Theatre in Seattle, Washington, appeared on the live video Live! Tonight! Sold Out!! in November 1994. The full concert was released on DVD and Blu-Ray on Live at the Paramount.
In November 2021, a version of the song recorded at the Paradiso in Amsterdam, the Netherlands, on November 25, 1991, was released on Blu-Ray and CD on the 30th anniversary "Super Deluxe" version of Nevermind.
The 30th anniversary "Super Deluxe" version of Nevermind also featured live versions of the song recorded at Del Mar Fairgrounds in Del Mar, California on December 28, 1991, at The Palace in Melbourne, Australia on February 2, 1992, and at the Nakano Sunplaza in Tokyo, Japan on February 19, 1992.
A live version, recorded at the 1992 Reading Festival, on August 30, 1992, in Reading, England, appeared on the CD and DVD release Live at Reading in November 2009.
A live version, recorded for MTV on December 13, 1993, at Pier 48 in Seattle, Washington, appeared on the live video, Live and Loud in September 2013, An edited version of the show, including "Breed," first aired on MTV on December 31, 1993.

Cover versions

References

External links

1989 songs
Nirvana (band) songs
Songs written by Kurt Cobain
Song recordings produced by Butch Vig
American punk rock songs
Hardcore punk songs